Elena Dementieva was the defending champion, but she retired from the sport at the end of the 2010 season.

Petra Kvitová won the title, defeating Kim Clijsters in the final 6–4, 6–3.

By reaching the quarterfinals, Clijsters gained world No. 1 ranking for the first time since 2006. She remains the only mother to be ranked No. 1 since the inception of the computer rankings in 1975.

Seeds
The top two seeds received a bye into the second round.

Qualifying

Draw

Finals

Top half

Bottom half

External links
Main Draw
Qualifying Draw

Singles 2011
Open GDF Suez - Singles